is a light festival held in Kobe, Japan, every December since 1995 to commemorate the Great Hanshin earthquake of that year. The lights were donated by the Italian Government and the installation itself is produced by Valerio Festi and Hirokazu Imaoka. Over 200,000 individually hand painted  lights are lit each year with electricity generated from biomass in order to stay environmentally friendly.

Lights are kept up for about two weeks and turned on for a few hours each evening. Major streets in the vicinity are closed to auto traffic during these hours to allow pedestrians to fill the streets and enjoy the lights. It is viewed by about three to five million people each year.

Symbolization 
When the Great Hanshin earthquake struck Kobe on January 17, 1995, it left more than 6,000 dead and caused $100 billion in damages. Since many had to live in darkness due to supply cuts in electricity, gas, and water, the idea of putting up lights acted as a symbol of hope, recovery, and renovation. Though it was only supposed to take place once, strong popularity and demand from citizens encouraged the continuation of luminarie to become an annual event.

Silent prayers to victims of the earthquake takes place in the opening ceremony, and a memorial naming those who were killed is posted during the night.

However, in 2020, due to the effects of the Coronavirus disease 2019, even if the scale was reduced, it was expected to cause congestion, and it was extremely difficult to implement infection control measures. Also, because the Italian craftsman has no prospect of entering Japan, the Kobe Luminarie event was canceled.

Tohoku Initiative 
In the 2011 luminarie, the same year as the Tohoku earthquake and tsunami, a special exhibition was held to raise money for its victims. In the 2012 luminarie, drawings by children from that region were used to make lanterns displayed at the event.

Tourist attraction 

The Hanshin earthquake left Kobe at a slump with tourist attractions. One of the factors that brought tourism back to Kobe was the sincerity of the luminarie event in honoring the victims of the earthquake.

The event attracts around 4 million people to Kobe every year and raises $1.3 million in donations and $6.1 million in sponsorship and merchandise sales.

The table below indicates the number of people attending the luminarie event each year since 2004.

The luminarie also has numerous sponsors. The following are just a few of the tens of dozens of sponsors for 2012;

 JR West
 Hankyu Corporation
 Nestle Group Japan
 Hanshin Electric Railway Co
 TOA (shares)
 Kadokawa Magazine Ltd.
 Sysmex Ltd

See also
 Christmas lights
Traditional lighting equipment of Japan
Parol
 Luminaria

References

External links

Osaka Hikari Renaissance (English)—another  light festival which takes place in December and January around Nakanoshima in central Osaka

Tourist attractions in Kobe
Winter festivals in Japan
Light festivals
Events in Kobe